Johanna Purdy (born December 26, 1984) is a Canadian pair skater. She competed in the 2005–06 season with Adam Schumacher and placed 10th at the Canadian Figure Skating Championships. Before teaming with up with Schumacher, Purdy competed with Kevin Maguire. With him, she was the 2001 Canadian junior national champion and competed twice at the World Junior Figure Skating Championships. Their partnership ended in 2002. After completing school, Johanna now works alongside her father at Carlton Group Limited.

References

External links
 Purdy & Schumacher profile

Canadian female pair skaters
1984 births
Living people
Figure skaters from Toronto